Andrea Heim (later Markus, born 11 February 1961) is a German female former volleyball player who competed for East Germany in the 1980 Summer Olympics.

She was born in Bergen auf Rügen.

In 1980 she was part of the East German team which won the silver medal in the Olympic tournament. She played two matches.

References 
 

1961 births
Living people
German women's volleyball players
Olympic volleyball players of East Germany
Volleyball players at the 1980 Summer Olympics
Olympic silver medalists for East Germany
Olympic medalists in volleyball
Medalists at the 1980 Summer Olympics
People from Bergen auf Rügen
Sportspeople from Mecklenburg-Western Pomerania